Deputy Federal Commissioner of Taxation (NSW) v W R Moran Pty Ltd (1939) 61 CLR 735 is a High Court of Australia case that deals with whether section 96 is limited by section 99, which prevents Commonwealth laws discriminating between States.

In this case, the Commonwealth imposed a tax on flour millers, but reimbursed the States based on their production of wheat in order to reimburse the flour millers by 90% of their taxes. The problem is that Tasmania, while milling flour, does not produce wheat. The majority held that the taxation was valid since the tax applied equally to all States, and there was no constitutional impediment to granting money discriminately. Per Latham CJ, section 96 is a means by which the Commonwealth, "when it thinks proper", can adjust inequalities between States. Thus, because there was no discrimination in taxation, yet grants are not subject to prohibitions based on discrimination, the majority held the laws to be valid.

Evatt J, conversely, examined the scheme as a whole, and ruled it invalid.

See also 

 Australian constitutional law

References 

 Winterton, G. et al. Australian federal constitutional law: commentary and materials, 1999. LBC Information Services, Sydney.

External links 
 Full text of the decision

High Court of Australia cases
1939 in Australian law
1939 in case law
Australian constitutional law
Grants power in the Australian Constitution cases